John Francis Smith, more commonly referred to as Ranger Smith (and known as Mr. Ranger by Yogi and Boo-Boo), is a fictional park ranger first appearing in the 1958 Yogi Bear cartoon series. The character is Yogi's main antagonist, and appears in other Yogi Bear series, including Yogi's Gang (1973), Yogi's Treasure Hunt (1985), and Yo Yogi! (1991), as well as the 2010 live-action Yogi Bear film. The cartoon character has been primarily voiced by Don Messick and Greg Burson.

History

Character
A former US Army soldier, he is the serious and stern authority figure in Jellystone Park, in contrast to the antics of the troublesome Yogi, and he greatly disapproves of Yogi's picnic basket thievery, mainly because it repels parkgoers and creates extra work for him.

In the original Yogi Bear shorts on Huckleberry Hound, a different and unnamed character that would evolve into Ranger Smith had a much different appearance, looking older, and with a white mustache, though his voice was the same (this character model was eventually used for Smith's boss in later specials), and other rangers also served as the authority figures in early episodes. Even after his trademark appearance had been established, Ranger Smith's design was notably inconsistently drawn throughout each episode of The Yogi Bear Show. In one episode, he appears as his young self, but this may be his first actual encounter with Yogi, as he does not appear to recognize him and refers to Yogi as "that bear".

Ranger Smith is sometimes very friendly with Yogi. In other episodes, he wants nothing more than to send Yogi away to the zoo. The attitudes of the Ranger towards Yogi usually parallel Yogi's behavior; if Yogi is up to mischief, then Smith wants to be rid of him; if Yogi is trying to behave himself, the ranger is often supportive. He seems to have a deep-down, if not grudging, respect for Yogi. Although the two have a somewhat antagonistic relationship, if serious trouble were to befall one of them, the other usually attempts to rescue him. They also have a long-running, friendly rivalry.

Ranger Smith genuinely likes Boo-Boo, because Boo-Boo always tries to stay out of trouble, unlike Yogi. Some episodes have Ranger Smith answering to his superior, the park commissioner.

Reception and significance 
Ranger Smith, together with similar children characters such as Ranger Rick and Disney's Ranger Woodlore has become a stereotype of the American park ranger. This had led to some complains from the park rangers about their job being misunderstood and not treated seriously by the public, which due to those stereotypes fails to recognize park rangers are law enforcement officers.

Other appearances

 Ranger Smith has appeared in some episodes of Yogi's Gang, in which he is seen with blond hair instead of black.
 Ranger Smith was a supporting character in Yogi's Treasure Hunt.
 Ranger Smith appeared once (Quebec/Baghdad) in Scooby's Laff-A-Lympics.
 Ranger Smith made a guest cameo in "The Story Stick" from A Pup Named Scooby-Doo.
 Ranger Smith appeared in two television films, which were part of the Hanna-Barbera Superstars 10 series: Yogi's Great Escape, and Yogi and the Invasion of the Space Bears.
 In Yo Yogi!, Ranger Smith is shown as Officer Smith (voiced by Greg Burson), who is a security guard at Jellystone Mall and often arrests the bad guys upon their defeat.
 Ranger Smith made a cameo appearance in I Am Weasel episode "I Am My Lifetime", being jailed.  
 Ranger Smith has become a starring character in parody shorts produced by the now-defunct animation company Spümcø, including Boo Boo Runs Wild, A Day in the Life of Ranger Smith, and Boo Boo and the Man. In those appearances, Ranger Smith was voiced by Corey Burton.
 Various designs for Ranger Smith made nonspeaking appearances in the Harvey Birdman, Attorney at Law episode "Identity Theft", referencing the noticeable inconsistencies the design experienced in the original cartoon.
 Ranger Smith appeared in the Robot Chicken episode "President Evil", voiced by Seth Green. In a movie trailer segment that featured Yogi and Boo Boo, Ranger Smith tells the sheriff that the cops will not catch Yogi, since he is smarter than the average bear.
 Ranger Smith is portrayed by actor Tom Cavanagh in the Yogi Bear feature film released December 17, 2010.
 Ranger Smith can be briefly spotted in a Metlife commercial that aired in 2012.
 Ranger Smith appears in the HBO Max series Jellystone! voiced again by Jeff Bergman. He appears as the administrator of Jellystone Hospital.

Portrayers
From the time of the character's debut until 1994, Ranger Smith was voiced by Don Messick, using his natural voice. His last performance as the character was in Yogi the Easter Bear.

In Yo Yogi!, the character was known as Officer Smith and voiced by Greg Burson.

In the Spümcø shorts, Ranger Smith is voiced by Corey Burton.

Although more famous for his work in the Scooby-Doo franchise, Scott Innes briefly voiced Ranger Smith, as well.

In the Yogi Bear film, the character is portrayed by Tom Cavanagh.

Others
 Daws Butler (1958-1959)
 Frank Milano (1961, 1964; Songs of Yogi Bear and his Pals LP and Hey There, It's Yogi Bear! LP)
 Mike Stewart (1962; How to Be a Better-Than-the Average Child Without Really Trying!)
 Billy West (Cartoon Network, 1990s commercials)
 Jeff Bergman (2001, 2018, 2021-present; Lullabye-Bye Bear, Yogi Bear slot machine, Jellystone!)
 Seth Green (2008, 2013; Robot Chicken, Mad)
 Tom Cavanagh (Yogi Bear: The Video Game)
 Mikey Day (2011; Mad)
 Jamie Kaler (2012; Robot Chicken)
 Eric Bauza (Quicken Loans commercial)

Animated media

Television shows
 The Huckleberry Hound Show (1958–1960)
 The Yogi Bear Show (1961–1962)
 Yogi's Gang (1973) (episodes "Mr. Prankster", "The Gossipy Witch", and "Lotta Litter")
 Laff-A-Lympics (1977) (episode "Quebec, Canada and Baghdad, Iraq")
 Yogi's Treasure Hunt (1985–1986)
 The New Yogi Bear Show (1988)
 A Pup Named Scooby-Doo (1988) (episode "The Story Stick")
 A Yabba Dabba Doo Celebration: 50 Years of Hanna-Barbera (1989)
 Yo Yogi! (1991) (voiced by Greg Burson)
 I Am Weasel (1998) (episode "I Am My Lifetime")
 Boo Boo Runs Wild and A Day in the Life of Ranger Smith (1999) (voiced by Corey Burton)
 Boo Boo and the Man (2000)
 Harvey Birdman, Attorney at Law (2002) (episode "Identity Theft")
 Jellystone! (2021)

Films and specials
 Hey There, It's Yogi Bear! (1964)
 Yogi's First Christmas (1980)
 Yogi Bear's All Star Comedy Christmas Caper (1982)
 Yogi's Great Escape (1987)
 Yogi and the Invasion of the Space Bears (1988)
 Yogi the Easter Bear (1994)
 Yogi Bear (2010) (portrayed by Tom Cavanagh)

Video games
 Yogi Bear: The Video Game (2010)

See also
 List of Hanna-Barbera characters
 List of Yogi Bear characters
 The Yogi Bear Show
 The New Yogi Bear Show
 Yogi's Treasure Hunt

References

Yogi Bear characters
Fictional United States Army personnel
Fictional park rangers
Television characters introduced in 1958
Hanna-Barbera characters
Male characters in animation